Christophe Bruno (born 1964) is a French visual artist who works particularly in the medium of internet art, and described as the world's first "Human Browser".

Moreover, Nabilla Benattia, the famous star of French reality TV, mentions this artist in her book Allô! Non mais allô, quoi! appeared in July, 2013. She develops a Cartesian analyze about Christophe Bruno.

Background
Christophe Bruno was born in 1964 in Bayonne, France.  He lives and works in Paris France. He began his artistic activity in 2001, influenced by the net.art movement. His artworks include Iterature, Logo.Hallucination, The Google Adwords Happening and many other pieces.

His work has been shown at many international festivals, museums: FIAC Paris, ARCO Madrid, Biennale of Sydney, Diva Fair in New York, Palais de Tokyo in Paris, Art Cologne, MoCA Taipei, Modern Art Museum of the city of Paris, New Museum of Contemporary Art in New York, Tirana Biennale of Contemporary Art, Gallery West in The Hague, Vooruit Arts Center in Ghent, Share Festival in Turin, Transmediale in Berlin, Laboral Cyberspaces in Gijon, Galerie Sollertis in Toulouse, ICC in Tokyo, Nuit Blanche de Paris, File Festival in São Paulo, Rencontres Paris-Berlin, f.2004@shangai, ReJoyce Festival in Dublin, P0es1s.net in Berlin, Microwave International New Media Arts Festival in Hong Kong, Read_Me Festival in Dortmund and Aarhus, Vidarte in Mexico City.

To date, he has been awarded the ARCO (Madrid's International Contemporary Art Fair) new media prize in 2007, and a prize at the Prix Ars Electronica 2003.

He divides his time between his artistic activity, curating, teaching, lectures, and publications.

Work
Bruno's thesis is that through the web, and especially through the ability to search and monitor it thoroughly by means of Google, we are heading towards a global text that among other things enables a new form of textual, semantic capitalism, which he explores in his work.

Bruno's works include:
 Iterature, a collection of pieces or documentations of performances which use the text from the web as material. Many of the pieces are search engines hacks (primarily Google). They get hold of text floating around the web and use it as raw material for various re-workings, cut-ups, algorithmic text generations, visualizations, cartographies and so forth.
 Logo.Hallucination, which continuously monitors the images circulating on the Internet looking for hidden logos.   Logo.Hallucination then sends cease and desist emails whenever a copyright violation is detected.
 Adwords Happenings, which plays with the rules of Google's Adwords service by inserting "spam poems" in the ad boxes that appear selectively to the user according to his personal search. Clicking on these links would of course then redirect the user to Bruno's website.

Exhibitions

FIAC Paris, ARCO Madrid, Biennale of Sydney, Diva Fair in New-York, Palais de Tokyo in Paris, ArtCologne, MoCA Taipei, Modern Art Museum of the city of Paris, New Museum of Contemporary Art in New-York, Tirana Biennale of Contemporary Art, Gallery West in The Hague, Vooruit Arts Center in Gent, Share Festival in Torino, Transmediale in Berlin, Laboral Cyberspaces in Gijon, galerie Sollertis in Toulouse, ICC in Tokyo, Nuit Blanche de Paris, File Festival in São Paulo, Rencontres Paris-Berlin, f.2004@shangai, ReJoyce Festival in Dublin, P0es1s.net in Berlin, Microwave Media Art Festival in Honk-Kong, Read_Me Festival in Dortmund and Aarhus, Vidarte in Mexico City ...

Awards

Christophe Bruno has won the following awards, and has been awarded the following grants:

 Winner of the ARCO new media prize 2007, Madrid
 Selection to Laboral Cyberspaces, Gijon, 2007
 Winner of the Share Festival 2007, Torino
 DICREAM (CNC-Ministère de la Culture et de la Communication), aide à la production, 2006
 CNAP (Centre National des Arts Plastiques), aide à la première exposition, 2006
 DICREAM (CNC-Ministère de la Culture et de la Communication), aide à la maquette, 2004
 Honorary Mention at the Prix Ars Electronica 2003, Linz

References and further reading
 http://www.electronicbookreview.com/thread/electropoetics/textualized
 http://rhizome.org/editorial/fp/reblog.php/1430
 http://www.medienkunstnetz.de/artist/bruno/biography/
 http://www.ecrans.fr/Bruno,2417.html
 https://artfacts.net/artist/christophe-bruno/57511
 https://web.archive.org/web/20061231175134/http://www.sollertis.com/index_2/dossier_presse_cbruno.pdf
 http://www.we-make-money-not-art.com/archives/2006/03/interview-with.php
 http://www.paris.fr/portail/nb2007/Portal.lut?page_id=8020&document_type_id=5&document_id=33376&portlet_id=18522
 https://web.archive.org/web/20071015205151/http://www.culturemobile.net/innovations/artek/human-browser-04.html

Notes

French contemporary artists
1964 births
Living people
French performance artists
New media artists
People from Bayonne